Grazia Deruta is pottery producer in Deruta, Italy, the family business with the tradition from 1500.

In the factory building is the Grazia Museum founded in 2001 and presenting 690 ceramic works, the ancient origins and the development of the Grazia factory.

See also 
List of oldest companies

References

External links 
Homepage

Ceramics manufacturers of Italy
Companies established in the 15th century
15th-century establishments in Italy